Punk TV is an electronic rock band from Novosibirsk, Russia. It was founded in 2003.

History
The group was formed in Novosibirsk in 2003.

Reviews
The band's debut album "Punk TV" received positive reviews from music critics:

Albums
 2005 – Punk TV
 2007 – Music for the broken keys
 2009 – Loverdrive
 2011 – Space Shadows
 2012 – Loverdub (remix version of "Loverdrive" album)

Singles and EP
 2006 – Snowboy Remixes
 2008 – Sunderground EP
 2009 – Every minute is OK EP
 2010 – S.S.
 2010 – Solar EP
 2011 – Phantom Remixes

References

External links
 Новосибирская группа Punk TV рассказала об истории успеха. Тайга.инфо.

Musical groups from Novosibirsk
Russian electronic music groups
Musical groups established in 2003